Anatoly Alexeyevich Karatsuba (his first name often spelled Anatolii) (Grozny, Soviet Union, 31 January 1937 – Moscow, Russia, 28 September 2008) was a Russian mathematician working in the field of analytic number theory, p-adic numbers and Dirichlet series.

For most of his student and professional life he was associated with the Faculty of Mechanics and Mathematics of Moscow State University, defending a D.Sc. there entitled "The method of trigonometric sums and intermediate value theorems" in 1966. He later held a position at the Steklov Institute of Mathematics of the Academy of Sciences.

His textbook Foundations of Analytic Number Theory went to two editions, 1975 and 1983.

The Karatsuba algorithm is the earliest known divide and conquer algorithm for multiplication and lives on as a special case of its direct generalization, the Toom–Cook algorithm.

The main research works of Anatoly Karatsuba were published in more than 160 research papers and monographs.

His daughter, Yekaterina Karatsuba, also a mathematician, constructed the FEE method.

Work on informatics 
As a student of Lomonosov Moscow State University, Karatsuba attended the seminar of Andrey Kolmogorov and found solutions to two problems set up by Kolmogorov. This was essential for the development of automata theory and started a new branch in Mathematics, the theory of fast algorithms.

Automata 
In the paper of :Edward F. Moore, an automaton (or a machine) , is defined as a device with  states,  input symbols
and  output symbols. Later such  machines got the name of Moore machines. At the end of the paper, in the chapter «New problems», Moore formulates the problem of improving the estimates which he obtained in Theorems 8 and 9:

 Theorem 8 (Moore).

In 1957 Karatsuba proved two theorems which completely solved the Moore problem on improving the estimate of the length of experiment in his Theorem 8.

 Theorem A (Karatsuba). If  is a  machine such that each two its states can be distinguished from each other then there exists a ramified experiment of length at most , by means of which one can find the state  at the end of the experiment.

 Theorem B (Karatsuba).

These two theorems were proved by Karatsuba in his 4th year as a basis of his 4th year project; the corresponding paper was submitted to the journal "Uspekhi Mat. Nauk" on December 17, 1958 and published  in June 1960. Up to this day (2011) this result of Karatsuba that later acquired the title "the Moore-Karatsuba theorem", remains the only precise (the only precise non-linear order of the estimate) non-linear result both in the automata theory and in the similar problems of the theory of complexity of computations.

Work on number theory
The main research works of A. A. Karatsuba were published in more than 160 research papers and monographs.

The p-adic method 
A.A.Karatsuba constructed a new -adic method in the theory of trigonometric sums.  The estimates of so-called -sums of the form

 

led to the new bounds for zeros of the Dirichlet -series modulo a power of a prime number, to the asymptotic formula for the number of Waring congruence of the form

 

to a solution of the problem of distribution of fractional parts of a polynomial with integer coefficients modulo . A.A. Karatsuba was the first to realize in the -adic form the «embedding principle» of Euler-Vinogradov and to compute a -adic analog of Vinogradov -numbers when estimating the number of solutions of a congruence of the Waring type.

Assume that :  and moreover :  where  is a prime number.

This new approach, found by Karatsuba, led to a new -adic proof of the Vinogradov mean value theorem, which plays the central part in the Vinogradov's method of trigonometric sums.

Another component of the -adic method of A.A. Karatsuba is the transition from incomplete systems of equations to complete ones at the expense of the local -adic change of unknowns.

Let  be an arbitrary natural number, . Determine an integer  by the inequalities . Consider the system of equations

 

 

Karatsuba proved that the number of solutions  of this system of equations for  satisfies the estimate

 

For incomplete systems of equations, in which the variables run through numbers with small prime divisors, Karatsuba applied multiplicative translation of variables. This led to an essentially new estimate of trigonometric sums and a new mean value theorem for such systems of equations.

The Hua Luogeng problem on the convergency exponent of the singular integral in the Terry problem 
-adic method of A.A.Karatsuba includes the techniques of estimating the measure of the set of points with small values of functions in terms of the values of their parameters (coefficients etc.) and, conversely, the techniques of estimating those parameters in terms of the measure of this set in the real and -adic metrics. This side of Karatsuba's method manifested itself especially clear in estimating trigonometric  integrals, which led to the solution of the problem of Hua Luogeng. In 1979 Karatsuba, together with his students G.I. Arkhipov and V.N. Chubarikov obtained a complete solution of the Hua Luogeng problem of finding the exponent of convergency of the integral:

 
where  is a fixed number.

.

At the same time, the similar problem for the integral was solved: 
 
where  are integers, satisfying the conditions : 

Karatsuba and his students proved that the integral  converges, if  and diverges, if .

The integrals  and  arise in the studying of the so-called Prouhet–Tarry–Escott problem. Karatsuba and his students obtained a series of new results connected with the multi-dimensional analog of the Tarry problem. In particular, they proved that if  is a polynomial in  variables of the form :
 
with the zero free term, 
,  is
This result, being not a final one, generated a new area in the theory of trigonometric integrals, connected with improving the bounds of the exponent of convergency  (I. A. Ikromov, M. A. Chahkiev and others).

Multiple trigonometric sums 
In 1966–1980, Karatsuba developed (with participation of his students G.I. Arkhipov and V.N. Chubarikov) the theory of multiple Hermann Weyl trigonometric sums, that is, the sums of the form

  , where  ,

 is a system of real coefficients . The central point of that theory, as in the theory of the Vinogradov trigonometric sums, is the following mean value theorem.

 Let  be natural numbers, ,.
  , :

The mean value theorem and the lemma on the multiplicity of intersection of multi-dimensional parallelepipeds form the basis of the estimate of a multiple trigonometric sum, that was obtained by Karatsuba (two-dimensional case was derived by G.I. Arkhipov). Denoting by  the least common multiple of the numbers  with the condition , for  the estimate holds

  ,

The estimate of the Hardy function in the Waring problem 
Applying his -adic form of the Hardy-Littlewood-Ramanujan-Vinogradov method to estimating trigonometric sums, in which the summation is taken over numbers with small prime divisors, Karatsuba obtained a new estimate of the well known Hardy function  in the Waring's problem (for ):

Multi-dimensional analog of the Waring problem 
In his subsequent investigation of the Waring problem Karatsuba obtained the following two-dimensional generalization of that problem:

Consider the system of equations

This system has solutions, if  , and if , then there exist such , that the system has no solutions.

The Artin problem of local representation of zero by a form 
Emil Artin had posed the problem on the -adic representation of zero by a form of arbitrary degree d. Artin initially conjectured a result, which would now be described as the p-adic field being a C2 field; in other words non-trivial representation of zero would occur if the number of variables was at least d2. This was shown not to be the case by an example of Guy Terjanian. Karatsuba showed that, in order to have a non-trivial representation of zero by a form, the number of variables should grow faster than polynomially in the degree d; this number in fact should have an almost exponential growth, depending on the degree.

 

which has only trivial representation of zero in the 2-adic numbers. They also obtained a similar result for any odd prime modulus .

Estimates of short Kloosterman sums 
Karatsuba developed (1993—1999) a new method of estimating short
Kloosterman sums, that is, trigonometric sums of the form

 

L. Carlitz, S. Uchiyama, A. Weil). The only exception was the special moduli of the form , where  is a fixed prime and the exponent  increases to infinity (this case was studied by A. G. Postnikov by means of the method of Vinogradov). Karatsuba's method makes it possible to estimate Kloosterman sums where the number of summands does not exceed

and in some cases even

where  is an arbitrarily small fixed number. The final paper of  Karatsuba on this subject was published posthumously.

Various aspects of the method of Karatsuba have found applications in the following problems of analytic number theory:

 finding asymptotics of the sums of fractional parts of the form :  : where  runs, one after another, through the integers satisfying the condition , and  runs through the primes that do not divide the module  (Karatsuba);

 the precision of approximation of an arbitrary real number in the segment  by fractional parts of the form :
(Karatsuba);

 a more precise constant  in the Brun–Titchmarsh theorem :
 : where  is the number of primes , not exceeding  and belonging to the arithmetic progression  
(J. Friedlander, H. Iwaniec);

 a lower bound for the greatest prime divisor of the product of numbers of the form :
,  
(D. R. Heath-Brown);

 proving that there are infinitely many primes of the form:
 
(J. Friedlander, H. Iwaniec);

 combinatorial properties of the set of numbers :

 
(A. A. Glibichuk).

The Riemann zeta function

The Selberg zeroes 
In 1984 Karatsuba proved, that for a fixed  satisfying the condition

The special case  was proven by Atle Selberg earlier in 1942.

Distribution of zeros of the Riemann zeta function on the short intervals of the critical line 
Karatsuba developed (1992) a new approach to investigating zeros of the Riemann zeta-function on «supershort» intervals of the critical line, that is, on the intervals , the length  of which grows slower than any, even arbitrarily small degree . In particular, he proved that for any given numbers ,  satisfying the conditions  almost all intervals  for  contain at least  zeros of the function . This estimate is quite close to the one that follows from the Riemann hypothesis.

Zeros of linear combinations of Dirichlet L-series 
Karatsuba developed a new method  of investigating zeros of functions which can be represented as linear combinations of Dirichlet -series. The simplest example of a function of that type is the Davenport-Heilbronn function, defined by the equality

 

where  is a non-principal character modulo  (for any ),

 

For  Riemann hypothesis is not true, however, the critical line  contains, nevertheless, abnormally many zeros.

 

zeros of the function . Similar results were obtained by Karatsuba also for linear combinations containing arbitrary (finite) number of summands; the degree exponent  is here replaced by a smaller number , that depends only on the form of the linear combination.

The boundary of zeros of the zeta function and the multi-dimensional problem of Dirichlet divisors 

For  there is an asymptotic formula of the form

  ,

  ,

where ,  are some absolute positive constants.

(A similar looking, but weaker result was obtained in 1960 by a German mathematician Richert, whose paper remained unknown to Soviet mathematicians at least until the mid-seventies.)

  .

Karatsuba found (2000) the backward relation of estimates of the values  with the behaviour of
 near the line . In particular, he proved that if  is an arbitrary non-increasing function satisfying the condition , such that for all  the estimate

 

holds, then  has no zeros in the region

 

( are some absolute constants).

Estimates from below of the maximum of the modulus of the zeta function in small regions of the critical domain and on small intervals of the critical line 

 

Here  is a sufficiently large positive number, . The case  was studied earlier by Ramachandra; the case , where  is a sufficiently large constant, is trivial.

Karatsuba proved, in particular, that if the values  and  exceed certain sufficiently small constants, then the estimates

hold, where  are certain absolute constants.

Behaviour of the argument of the zeta-function on the critical line 
Karatsuba obtained a number of new results related to the behaviour of the function , which is called the argument of Riemann zeta function on the
critical line (here  is the increment of an arbitrary continuous branch of  along the broken line joining the points  and ). Among those results are the mean value theorems for the function  and its first integral  on intervals of the real line, and also the theorem claiming that every interval  for  contains at least

 

points where the function  changes sign. Earlier similar results were obtained by Atle Selberg for the case
.

The Dirichlet characters

Estimates of short sums of characters in finite fields 
In the end of the sixties Karatsuba, estimating short sums of Dirichlet characters, developed  a new method, making it possible to obtain non-trivial estimates of short sums of characters in finite fields. Let
Furthermore, let  be a sufficiently large prime, such that  is irreducible modulo ,
 the Galois field with a basis ,  a non-principal Dirichlet character of the field . Finally, let  be some nonnegative integers,  the set of elements  of the Galois field ,

  ,

  .

 

the following estimate holds:

 

Estimates of linear sums of characters over shifted prime numbers 
Karatsuba developed a number of new tools, which, combined with the Vinogradov method of estimating sums with prime numbers, enabled him to obtain in 1970  an estimate of the sum of values of a non-principal character modulo a prime  on a sequence of shifted prime numbers, namely, an estimate of the form

 

where  is an integer satisfying the condition ,  an arbitrarily small fixed number, and the constant  depends on  only.

In 1971 speaking at the International conference on number theory on the occasion of the 80th birthday of Ivan Matveyevich Vinogradov, Academician Yuri Linnik noted the following:

This estimate is of crucial importance, as it is so deep that gives more than the extended Riemann hypothesis, and, it seems, in that directions is a deeper fact than that conjecture (if the conjecture is true). Recently this estimate was improved by A.A.Karatsuba».

This result was extended by Karatsuba to the case when  runs through the primes in an arithmetic progression, the increment of which grows with the modulus
.

Estimates of sums of characters on polynomials with a prime argument 
Karatsuba found  a number of estimates of sums of
Dirichlet characters in polynomials of degree two for the case when the argument of the polynomial runs through a short sequence of subsequent primes.

 

the following estimate holds:

 

A similar estimate was obtained by Karatsuba also for the case when  runs through a sequence of primes in an arithmetic progression, the increment of which may grow together with the modulus .

This conjecture is still open.

Lower bounds for sums of characters in polynomials 
Karatsuba constructed  an infinite sequence of primes  and a sequence of polynomials  of degree  with integer coefficients, such that  is not a full square modulo ,

 

and such that

 

In other words, for any  the value  turns out to be a quadratic residues modulo . This result shows that André Weil's estimate

cannot be essentially improved and the right hand side of the latter inequality cannot be replaced by say the value , where  is an absolute constant.

Sums of characters on additive sequences 
Karatsuba found a new method, making it possible to obtain rather precise estimates of sums of values of non-principal Dirichlet characters on additive sequences, that is, on sequences consisting of numbers of the form , where the variables  and  runs through some sets
 and  independently of each other. The most characteristic example of that kind is the following claim which is applied in solving a wide class of problems, connected with summing up values of Dirichlet characters. Let  be an arbitrarily small fixed number,  a sufficiently large prime,  a non-principal character modulo . Furthermore, let  and  be arbitrary subsets of the complete system of congruence classes modulo , satisfying only the conditions , . Then the following estimate holds:

 

 

Distribution of power congruence classes and primitive roots in sparse sequences 
Karatsuba obtained (2000) non-trivial estimates of sums of values of Dirichlet characters "with weights", that is, sums of components of the form , where  is a function of natural argument. Estimates of that sort are applied in solving a wide class of problems of number theory, connected with distribution of power congruence classes, also primitive roots in certain sequences.

Let  be an integer,  a sufficiently large prime, where , and set, finally,

 

  .

  ,

where  are all prime divisors of the number .

Karatsuba applied his method also to the problems of distribution of power residues (non-residues) in the sequences of shifted primes , of the integers of the type  and some others.

Late work 
In his later years, apart from his research in number theory (see Karatsuba phenomenon, Karatsuba studied certain problems of theoretical physics, in particular in the area of quantum field theory. Applying his ATS theorem and some other number-theoretic approaches, he obtained new results in the Jaynes–Cummings model in quantum optics.

Awards and titles 
 1981: P.L.Tchebyshev Prize of Soviet Academy of Sciences
 1999: Distinguished Scientist of Russia
 2001: I.M.Vinogradov Prize of Russian Academy of Sciences

Personal life 

All his life Karatsuba enjoyed many sports: in his younger years, athletics, weightlifting and wrestling, then hiking, rock climbing, caving and mountaineering.
 Four times he climbed Mount Elbrus. He hiked in the mountains of Caucasus, Pamir Mountains and, especially in the last years of his life, Tian Shan in Zailiysky Alatau and Teskey Ala-Too. He loved classical music and knew it very well, especially Johann Sebastian Bach and Antonio Vivaldi.

See also
 ATS theorem
 Karatsuba algorithm
 Moore machine

References

External links
 
 
 List of Research Works at Steklov Institute of Mathematics

Number theorists
Mathematical analysts
20th-century Russian mathematicians
21st-century Russian mathematicians
1937 births
2008 deaths
Soviet mathematicians
Moscow State University alumni